Batyle rufiventris is a species of beetle in the family Cerambycidae. It was described by Knull in 1928.

References

Trachyderini
Beetles described in 1928